Eric Johansson may refer to:

 Eric Johansson (handballer) (born 2000), Swedish handball player
 Eric Johansson (ice hockey) (born 1982), Swedish-Canadian ice hockey player
 Eric Johansson (athlete) (1904–1972), Swedish hammer thrower
 Eric Johansson, former member of the Riksdag (1971–1973) with the Social Democratic Party
 Erik Johansson i Simrishamn, former member of the Riksdag (1971–1985) with the Social Democratic Party

See also 
 Erik Johansson (disambiguation)